2C-F (4-fluoro-2,5-dimethoxyphenethylamine) is a lesser-known psychedelic drug of the 2C family.  It was first synthesized by Alexander Shulgin.  In his book PiHKAL, the minimum dosage is listed as 250 mg. 2C-F may be found as a brownish freebase oil, or as a white crystalline hydrochloride salt.

Pharmacology
Very little data exists about the pharmacological properties, metabolism, and toxicity of 2C-F.

Effect
At a dose of 250 milligrams, 2C-F produces modest closed-eye visuals accompanied by lethargy.

Legality

Canada
As of October 31, 2016, 2C-F is a controlled substance (Schedule III) in Canada.

References

2C (psychedelics)
Fluoroarenes